The Alliance Machine International Open was a golf tournament on the LPGA Tour, played only in 1959. It was played at the Alliance Country Club in Alliance, Ohio. Mickey Wright won the event.

References

Former LPGA Tour events
Golf in Ohio
Alliance, Ohio
History of women in Ohio
1959 establishments in Ohio
1959 disestablishments in Ohio